Id tech may refer to:
 International Display Technology, an IBM/Chi Mei partnership sold to Sony in 2005
 id Tech, a series of game engines developed by id Software
 ID Tech Camps, a computer camp, also referred to as "iD Tech"